Canthigaster investigatoris is a species of pufferfish in the family Tetraodontidae. It is an oviparous demersal species known only from Indonesia. It may occur as far down as 101 m (331 ft).

References 

investigatoris
Fish of Indonesia
Fish described in 1910